Trayveon Thomas Williams (born October 18, 1997) is an American football running back for the Cincinnati Bengals of the National Football League (NFL). During his junior season at Texas A&M, Williams received first team all-SEC and second-team All-America honors; he also broke the school records for single-season all-purpose yards and rushing yards.

College career

Freshman season
In his collegiate debut in the season opener against UCLA, Williams had 94 rushing yards. After gaining 127 yards against Auburn, including an 89-yard rushing touchdown, Williams was named the SEC Freshman of the Week. In the next game, against Arkansas, he had 153 rushing yards and two rushing touchdowns. On October 8, against Tennessee, he had a season-high 217 rushing yards and a rushing touchdown in the 45-38 2OT victory. Williams became the first true freshman in school history to rush for 1,000 yards in a season.

Sophomore season
Williams rushed for 203 yards against UCLA in the season-opening loss. Overall, he compiled 798 total rushing yards as a sophomore.

Junior season
Prior to the season, Williams was selected to the second team All-SEC preseason team. He rushed for 240 yards in season opener against Northwestern State, second highest single-game in school history. He was named one of ten semifinalists for the Doak Walker Award. Following the regular season, Williams received first-team all-SEC honors from the league's coaches and the Associated Press, and second-team All-America honors from the Associated Press, Athlon Sports, and Sporting News.

During the 2018 Gator Bowl, Williams broke the school records for single-season all-purpose yards and single-season rushing yards, and the Gator Bowl record for single-game rushing yards. The school record for single-season all-purpose yards was previously set by Cyrus Gray in 2010, while the single-season rushing yards record was set by Darren Lewis in 1988. Former Syracuse running back Floyd Little set the Gator Bowl record in 1966.  On January 3, 2019, Williams announced that he would forgo his final year of eligibility and declare for the 2019 NFL Draft.

Collegiate statistics

Professional career

Williams was drafted by the Cincinnati Bengals in the sixth round, 182nd overall, of the 2019 NFL Draft.

On August 31, 2021, Williams was waived by the Bengals and re-signed to the practice squad the next day. He was promoted to the active roster on December 4.

On March 16, 2023, Williams re-signed with the Bengals on a one-year contract.

References

External links
Cincinnati Bengals bio
Texas A&M Aggies bio

1997 births
Living people
Players of American football from Houston
American football running backs
Texas A&M Aggies football players
Cincinnati Bengals players